Alfred Motté (2 June 1887 – 31 October 1918) was a French athlete. He competed at the 1908 Summer Olympics and the 1912 Summer Olympics. He was killed in action during World War I.

See also
 List of Olympians killed in World War I

References

External links 
 

1887 births
1918 deaths
French male long jumpers
French male high jumpers
Sportspeople from Roubaix
Athletes (track and field) at the 1908 Summer Olympics
Athletes (track and field) at the 1912 Summer Olympics
Olympic athletes of France
French military personnel killed in World War I
19th-century French people
20th-century French people